The Porsche 911 RSR-19 is a racing car developed by Porsche to compete in the LM GTE category of the Automobile Club de l'Ouest sanctioned FIA World Endurance Championship, European Le Mans Series and the GTLM class, of the International Motor Sports Association's IMSA WeatherTech SportsCar Championship. It serves as the direct replacement for the Porsche 911 RSR (2017). The car made its racing debut at the 2019 4 Hours of Silverstone. The car was unveiled at the 2019 Goodwood Festival of Speed, at the timing gantry of the Hillclimb circuit, just moments before its first public run, with Gianmaria Bruni at the wheel.

Development 
The Porsche 911 RSR-19 was revealed to have been in development since 2017. In September 2018, spy shots of the new car were seen, published in the German Auto Motor und Sport automobile magazine, taken at the test track of the Porsche Development Center in Weissach, with initial rumors saying that the car would be turbocharged. In March 2019, a 30 hour endurance test was held at the Circuit Paul Ricard, in France. In May 2019, ahead of the 2019 24 Hours of Le Mans, one of the prototypes was spotted at the Autodromo Nazionale Monza, being pitted against its predecessor.

Compared to its predecessor, it has a significant number of changes, with 95% of the bodywork being new. Power comes from an upsized, rear-mid mounted six-cylinder naturally-aspirated 4.2 litre (4.194 litre) engine, the largest ever boxer configured engine in a works 911 racing model, paired with a faster sequential six-speed constant-mesh gearbox. The exhaust has also been relocated to the side, allowing for a larger diffuser to be installed, increasing the base downforce of the car.

Competition history

2019–20 FIA World Endurance Championship

GT World Endurance Manufacturers' Championship

Endurance Trophy for LMGTE Pro Teams

2020 IMSA WeatherTech Sportscar Championship

GT Le Mans Teams Championship

GT Le Mans Manufacturers Championship

2021 IMSA WeatherTech Sportscar Championship

GT Le Mans Teams Championship

GT Le Mans Manufacturers Championship

2021 FIA World Endurance Championship

GT World Endurance Manufacturers' Championship

Endurance Trophy for LMGTE Pro Teams

Endurance Trophy for LMGTE Am Teams

2022 FIA World Endurance Championship

GT World Endurance Manufacturers' Championship

Endurance Trophy for LMGTE Pro Teams

Endurance Trophy for LMGTE Am Teams

References 

911 RSR-19
LM GTE cars